Dziewin  is a village in the administrative district of Gmina Ścinawa, within Lubin County, Lower Silesian Voivodeship, in southwestern Poland.

References

Dziewin